The 2019 FIBA 3x3 World Cup was held in Amsterdam, the Netherlands. The tournament consisted of 20 teams. Italy were the defending champions but were defeated in the Quarterfinals by France. China won the title, their first overall, after defeating Hungary, 19–13.

Participating teams
All FIBA continental zones except for FIBA Africa & FIBA Americas are represented by at least one team. FIBA announced the final composition of the pools in May, 2019.

FIBA Asia (6)
  (1)
  (2)
  (6)
  (10)
  (11) 
  (16) 

FIBA Europe (12)
  (3)
  (4)
  (5) 
  (7)
  (8) (hosts)
  (9)
  (12)
  (13)
  (14)
  (15)
  (17)
  (19)

FIBA Oceania (2)
  (18)
  (20)

Players

Main tournament

Preliminary round

Pool A

Pool B

Pool C

Pool D

Knockout stage

Final standings

Awards

Individual awards

|-style="vertical-align: top;"
|
Most Valuable Player
 Jiang Jiayin (CHN)
Team of the Tournament  
 Jiang Jiayin (CHN)
 Migna Touré (FRA)
 Cyesha Goree (HUN)
|}

Individual contests

Skills contest

Shoot-out contest

References

External links
Official website

Women's
FIBA Women's 3x3 World Cup
3x3 World Cup
International women's basketball competitions hosted by the Netherlands
Bask